The enzyme thymidylate 5′-phosphatase (EC 3.1.3.35) catalyzes the reaction

thymidylate + H2O  thymidine + phosphate

This enzyme belongs to the family of hydrolases, specifically those acting on phosphoric monoester bonds.  The systematic name is thymidylate 5′-phosphohydrolase. Other names in common use include thymidylate 5′-nucleotidase, deoxythymidylate 5′-nucleotidase, thymidylate nucleotidase, deoxythymidylic 5′-nucleotidase, deoxythymidylate phosphohydrolase, and dTMPase.

References

 

EC 3.1.3
Enzymes of unknown structure